Nagqu (also Naqu, Nakchu,  or Nagchu;) is a prefecture-level city in the north of the Chinese autonomous region of Tibet. On May 7, 2018, the former Nagqu Prefecture was officially declared the sixth prefecture-level city in Tibet after Lhasa, Shigatse, Chamdo, Nyingchi and Shannan. As of the 2010 census, it had a population of 462,381.

Nagqu contains 89 townships, 25 towns and 1283 villages. Amdo, Nyainrong and Xainza are other towns of note.

Every August (the sixth month in the Tibetan calendar), Nagqu hosts the Kyagqen Horse Race, a major event locally attracting tens of thousands of herdsmen to participate in horseracing and archery contests.

Etymology
Nagqu was once known as "Heihe" which comes from that the Tibetan word means black river. It was named after Nagqu River which is the upper master stream of the Nu River running through the territory. In the Ming and Qing Dynasties, it was known as "Hala Wusu" (transliteration of the "Black River" in Mongolian). In modern times, Nagqu (the area around Nagqu Town) is called "Wu'erguxiong" or "Seruxiangba".

History
Nagqu appeared clearly in the earliest historical materials, it was part of the ancient Zhangzhung and it was called Yangtong in Chinese historical records. In Tibetan historical records, the place was called "Zhuodai", meaning "nomadic tribe", and the inhabitants here were called "Zhuoba", meaning "nomads"; or "Qiangba", meaning "northerner"; or "Changri", it means the northern tribe. In the era of the ascendancy of Zhangzhung, as its inhabitants divided their territory into the inner, outer and middle three parts. The modern Nagqu roughly is the territories of middle Zhangzhung and outer Zhangzhung.  The dzong architecture of Dangnuoqiong was the center of middle Zhangzhung, it was located round the lake of Tangra Yumco in the southwest of Nagqu. As the Zhangzhung Regime was weakened, its territory shrank to the west.

During the Song Dynasty, Nagqu was called one of the Four Northern Tribes. In 1269, the Mongolian soldiers began to garrison in the northern Tibet, and later the "39 Tribes of Hor" formed Mongolian forces in northern Tibet. In 1731, the Qing Government placed the territory of 39 Tribes under the direct jurisdiction of the Amban.

In 1751, Kanxiang Dzong in Nagqu was formed to the direct rule of the Kashag Government, and part of the area was under the jurisdiction of Panchen. Around the Xinhai Revolution, the government of the Kashag Government relegated the region of 39 Tribes to its rule and forcibly took over the Panchen Lama. In 1916, the "Hor Director" was established. In 1942, the prefecture of Changchub Chikyab was formed.

In 1951, the seat of Changchub Chikyab Prefecture was Nagqu (Heihe) Town, the prefecture administered the pasture land to the northern Lhasa and 6 dzongs in Heihe area, the Conference Hall of Panchen Chamber administered Damusajia Dzong. The prefecture of Changchub Chikyab had jurisdiction over 14 dzongs in 1954.

The Preparatory Committee of Tibet Autonomous Region set up Chikyab Office in Nagqu in October 1956, The prefecture of Changchub Chikyab was renamed to Heihe in 1959, the prefecture of Heihe was renamed to Nagqu in January 1960, its seat was Heihe County (modern Seni District).

The former Nagqu Prefecture was approved for prefecture-level city status on October 2, 2017, by the State Council, and it was officially established on May 7, 2018.

Geography and climate

Nagqu is located in the northeast of Tibet. Nagqu is bordered by Bayingolin and Hotan Prefectures of Xinjiang to the north, Haixi, Yushu Prefectures of Qinghai and Chamdo to the east, Nyingchi, Lhasa and Shigatse to the south, and Ngari Prefecture to the west. It lies on the southern slope of Tanggula Mountains, on the north side of Nyenchen Tanglha Mountains, and on the eastern end of the Changtang Plateau. Principal towns in the region include Nagqu Town, Amdo, Nyainrong and Xainza.

Nagqu is extremely rich in water resources, with a total surface water resources of about 54 billion cubic meters, groundwater resources of about 25.1 billion cubic meters and a further 8.8 billion cubic meters in glacial ice storage. The principal rivers of Nagqu are the Dangqu, Zhajia Zangbo, Jiagang Zangbu, Suoqu, Xiaqu, Benqu, Ba Qingqu, and Yiqu with hundreds more throughout the region.

Nagqu is affected by monsoon climate, plate geology movements, and complex terrain and other disaster-causing factors, it is a natural disaster-prone, contiguous and frequent region. Overall it classifies as a dry-winter subarctic climate (Dwc) bordering on a cold semi-arid climate (BSk), with relatively warm, humid summers and long, bitterly cold, dry, windy winters. The differences between day and night are severe. The annual sunshine hours are more than 2,886 hours. The southeastern part of the prefecture is wetter, with annual precipitation exceeding . while the northwestern part is dryest with an average annual rainfall below . The effects of global warming increasingly pose a problem in the region, with record highs in 2019.

Administrative divisions
The Naqu City People's Government administrative headquarters is located at No. 3, Zhejiang West Road in the main town. It has 89 townships, 25 towns, and 1283 villages under its jurisdiction.

Economy
By 2009, 55 different minerals had been discovered in the region, with the largest mineral reserves being iron, chromium, gold, antimony, lead, zinc, copper, boron, lithium, rock salt and gypsum. There are significant reserves of oil, natural gas, oil shale and others, though Nagqu had long been severely backwards in energy production and usage to the point that at one stage only Nagqu Town had a 2 MW diesel power plant. Geothermal energy production began investigation in 1984. Jiagang Hydropower Station in Xainza County was built in the 1990s and as of 2008 serves about 20,000 nomadic households across the county. In June 2019, Jinqiao Hydropower Station, the first hydropower station to be built with a rock-fill concrete gravity dam in Tibet, was inaugurated in Lhari County, serving some 30,000 local farmers and herdsmen in an area previously without electricity. The station and dam reportedly cost 1.4 billion yuan (about 202.7 million U.S. dollars) and has an annual power generation capacity of 357 million kilowatt-hours.

With Nagqu being one of China's five biggest pastures, and possibly the highest in the world at 4,500 metres above sea level, most counties rely on animal husbandry, and few counties are semi-agricultural and semi-animal husbandry areas. As of 2017, the regional GDP in Nagqu was 11,982 million yuan (1,775 million US dollars), completed fixed assets investment 18,549 million yuan (2,747 million US dollars), urban and rural residents per capita disposable income reached 31,252 yuan (4,629 US dollars), 9,792 yuan (1,450 US dollars), total retail sales of social consumer goods 2,127 million yuan (315 million US dollars), tax revenue exceeded 1,000 million yuan (148 million US dollars). Agriculture and animal husbandry accounted for 1.923 billion yuan. By 2015, the manufacturing industry was expected to be valued at 1.852 billion yuan, an increase of 23.4%. Production of medicines and Tibetan carpets have significantly increased in recent times. As of 2015 there were 5 scientific research institutions and 11 agricultural and animal husbandry science and technology-related institutions, employing 5,856 professional and technical personnel.

Culture
Nagqu contains a number of Tibetan Buddhist monasteries. Shodain Monastery (also known as "Shodain Yarba" or "Shadain"), with around 350 lamas, is one of the most significant, and is governed by Sera Monastery in Lhasa. The monastery was established in 1884 and originally belonged to the Nyingma sect before the Geru sect. The 13th Dalai Lama lived at the monastery for over a month in 1908 during his return journey from Beijing. He inaugurated the Grand Summons Ceremony to be held annually on January 4 in the Tibetan calendar. The Changmo dance, also known as Je Changmo or Jusong Changmo Qin (Changmo means dance or hop,  is common practice at Shodain during August. The middle roof of the monastery contains a golden law wheel surrounded by two golden sheep, alikened to that of Jokhang Monastery in Lhasa. Tsanden Monastery (also Zanden or Sanden) in Sog County was built in 1668 under the orders of Drepung Monastery. It covers an area of 25,975 square meters and with its white palace and red palace resembles the Potala Palace from a distance. The monastery contains numerous statues of Buddhas, murals, scriptures and works of art. Badan Bonner temple, founded by Shichong Garmahan is in the village of Sechang Village in Sog County, and contains an oratory and traditional Tibetan bleaching room. Zhajun Monastery in the southeast of Baingoin County contains a scripture hall, Buddha hall and Sengshe and is dedicated primarily to Shakyamuni.

Every August (June in the Tibetan calendar), Nagqu hosts the Kyagqen Horse Race, a major event locally, attracting tens of thousands of herdsmen who arrive in Nagqu on their horses and with goods. They set up camp in tents in the southern part of the main town and participate in horse racing, horsemanship and archery contests on August 10. Hats, mostly made from lamb skins and artificial leather and an "antenna-like stripe of fabric at the top" are worn by women during the festival.

In Baingoin County, the Qiduo Cave Paintings are significant, with one cave containing over 200 images of animals, characters and symbols.

Wildlife
Nagqu contains a high biodiversity of wildlife. There are wild goats, stone sheep, scorpions, donkeys, bears, foxes, wolves, and birds such as Tibetan finch, brown-backed crow, pheasant, vulture, wild ducks, swans, black-necked cranes, and red-crowned cranes. As of 2018 seven wildlife sanctuaries have been established in Nagqu. The 400,000 hectare Siling Co National Nature Reserve (also Selincuo Reserve or Xainza Nature Reserve) around Siling Lake was established in 1993 and contains significant populations of black-necked cranes and some 120 species of birds in total.

Fritillaria  grow on alpine bushes and alpine meadows at an altitude of 4000–5000 meters, and is valued in Chinese herbal medicine for its ability to loosen mucus on the lungs and cure pulmonary-related ailments. Cordyceps sinensis is also valued for its effect on the lungs and kidneys, and is eaten as a delicacy in soups in restaurants in countries such as Singapore. Snow Lotus and Musk, known for its central nervous system stimulating effect, are also grown. Due to the region being too cold for trees to grow, the Chinese government are considering using solar power to introduce new forested areas to Nagqu, though it is not believed to be economically sustainable.

Transport

In 2015, 129 transportation projects were constructed, with a projected investment of 6.29 billion yuan, though only 2.422 billion yuan was completed. Main lines of communication includes the Qinghai-Tibet Railway, the G 109 National Highway, the Nagqu–Chamdo, and the Nagqu–Shiquanhe highways.

Notable people
Jamyang Sherab (1957–2004), member of the Chinese Communist Party, deputy secretary of the Nagqu Culture Bureau, and secretary general and executive vice chairman of the Tibet Autonomous Region. A member of the Sixth National Committee of the Chinese Writers Association, he published poetry and several novels, one of which won the 1994 Tibetan Literature newcomer's award.
Shabdrung Rinpoche, (1997- in Lhari County), Buddhist monk, recognized as the reincarnation of the 22nd Shabdrung Living Buddha. In 2011 he opened the Tibet College of Buddhism in Lhasa.
Tsewang Norbu

References

Further reading
 Nagqu Prefecture Annals

External links

 Nagqu News Website

 
Prefecture-level divisions of Tibet